Dalian W.F.C. was a professional Chinese football club in Dalian, Liaoning.

History

The team was founded in 1984 as Dalian Women's Football Team, and participated in National Games of China, representing Liaoning province. In 1994, Dalian Women's Football Team won the Chinese Women's Football League championship for the first time. However, the team encountered some difficulties, and suffered for a few years. In 2002, Dalian Shide Corp. purchased the team and officially named it as Dalian Shide Women's F.C.

In 2013 when Dalian Shide F.C. broke down and was purchased by Dalian Aerbin, the women's team also changed its name to Dalian Aerbin W.F.C. However, they faced financial problems shortly after winning a championship in 2013.

Quanjian Group took possession of the team in 2015 and renamed it as Dalian Quanjian F.C. In 2016, the team won the Chinese Women's Super League championship. Before the 2017 Chinese Women's Super League season, they made several prominent international player acquisitions, including Asisat Oshoala from Arsenal L.F.C. and Gaelle Enganamouit from FC Rosengård, hired manager Farid Benstiti, previously manager of Paris Saint-Germain, and unveiled new uniforms and staff.

In 2019 Shu Yuhui president of Quanjian was arrested and Dalian Quanjian F.C. was renamed Dalian W.F.C.; after the season, it was dissolved.

Ownership and naming history

Crest history

Notable players
 Han Duan
 Bi Yan
 Han Wenxia
 Asisat Oshoala
 Fabiana da Silva Simões
 Gabi Zanotti
 Debora Cristiane de Oliveira

Coaching staff

Managerial history

Honours

League
 Women's Super League (Women's National Football League)
Winners (6): 2008, 2012, 2013, 2016, 2017, 2018

References

External links
  Official Website 

 
Chinese Women's Super League clubs
1984 establishments in China
Association football clubs established in 1984
History of Dalian
Sport in Dalian
2019 disestablishments in China
Association football clubs disestablished in 2019